Brody Stevens: Enjoy It! is a television series on Comedy Central. The series was a documentary that followed the life of comedian Brody Stevens alongside Zach Galifianakis.

Episodes

References

External links
 
 Website

2013 American television series debuts
2014 American television series endings
2010s American mockumentary television series
Comedy Central original programming
English-language television shows